Mobilio may refer to:

 Albert Mobilio, American poet and critic
 Domenic Mobilio (1969–2004), Canadian professional soccer player
 Honda Mobilio, a 2001–2008, 2014–present Japanese mini MPV